In Greek mythology, Chlorus (Ancient Greek:  Χλώρου) was the son of Pelasgus and father of Haemon, father of Thessalus. In some accounts, however, Haemon was called the son of Pelasgus instead. Haemon and Thessalus were both eponyms of Haemonia and Thessaly.

Notes

References 

 Stephanus of Byzantium, Stephani Byzantii Ethnicorum quae supersunt, edited by August Meineike (1790–1870), published 1849. A few entries from this important ancient handbook of place names have been translated by Brady Kiesling. Online version at the Topos Text Project.
Strabo, The Geography of Strabo. Edition by H.L. Jones. Cambridge, Mass.: Harvard University Press; London: William Heinemann, Ltd. 1924. Online version at the Perseus Digital Library.
Strabo, Geographica edited by A. Meineke. Leipzig: Teubner. 1877. Greek text available at the Perseus Digital Library.

Characters in Greek mythology